A sports complex is a group of sports facilities.  For example, there are track and field stadiums, football stadiums, baseball stadiums, swimming pools, and Indoor arenas. This area is a sports complex, for fitness.  Olympic Park is also a kind of Entertainment complex.

Asia 
 Azadi Sport Complex
 Cebu City Sports Complex
 Dasana Indah Sport City
 Davao City–UP Sports Complex
 Davao del Norte Sports Complex
 Deli Sport City
 Doyo Baru Sport Complex
 Gelora Bung Karno Sports Complex
 Gelora Bung Tomo Sports Complex
 Rizal Memorial Sports Complex
 Jerusalem Sports Quarter
 Jakabaring Sport City
 Jalak Harupat Sports Complex
 JRD Tata Sports Complex
 Kalinga Stadium
 Lukas Enembe Sport Complex
 Malaysia National Sports Complex
 Marikina Sports Center
 Mimika Sport Complex
 Nanjing Olympic Sports Center
 New Clark City Sports Complex
 Olympic Green
 Panaad Park and Sports Complex
 Rawamangun Sports Complex
 Shree Shiv Chhatrapati Sports Complex
 Seoul Sports Complex
 Siliwangi Sport Complex
 Singapore Sports Hub
 The Sports Hub Trivandrum

Europe 
 Anella Olímpica
 Athens Olympic Sports Complex
 Faliro Coastal Zone Olympic Complex
 First Direct Arena
 Goudi Olympic Complex
 Headingley Stadium
 Hellinikon Olympic Complex
 Horsfall Stadium
 Manchester Regional Arena
 Odsal Stadium
 Olympiapark Berlin
 Park Avenue (stadium)
 Prioritet Serneke Arena
 Queen Elizabeth Olympic Park
 Torino Olympic Park

North America 
 Camden Yards Sports Complex
 ESPN Wide World of Sports Complex
 Gateway Sports and Entertainment Complex
 Meadowlands Sports Complex
 Olympic Park, Montreal
 South Philadelphia Sports Complex
 Truman Sports Complex
 Whistler Olympic Park

Oceania 
 Ballarat Sports Events Centre
 Camden Sports Complex
 Canberra International Sports & Aquatic Centre
 Marden Sports Complex
 Marrara Sporting Complex
 Maroochydore Multi Sports Complex
 Melbourne Sports and Entertainment Precinct
 Moreton Bay Central Sports Complex
 Murray Sporting Complex
 Piggabeen Sports Complex
 Queensland Sport and Athletics Centre
 Springvale Indoor Sports Centre
 South Pine Sports Complex
 Sydney Olympic Park
 Willows Sports Complex

South America 
 Atanasio Girardot Sports Complex
 Barra Olympic Park
 Deodoro Olympic Park

See also 

Sport venue
Multi-purpose stadium

References

Sports venues